The Algebra of Ice is a BBC Books original novel written by Lloyd Rose and based on the long-running British science fiction television series Doctor Who. It features the Seventh Doctor and Ace.

Synopsis
The Doctor and Ace investigate a 'crop circle' in the Kentish countryside; they are helped by a maths expert, a web-magazine publish and the Doctor's friend, the Brigadier. However, this crop circle is made of ice and is not circular, instead being filled with square-sided shapes. It draws the Doctor and Ace into a new level of reality.

Trivia
The story makes reference to the Riemann hypothesis, featuring a sequence set in a 'world' modelled on the Riemann zeta function.

External links
The Cloister Library - The Algebra of Ice

2004 British novels
2004 science fiction novels
Past Doctor Adventures
Seventh Doctor novels
Novels by Lloyd Rose
Novels set in Kent